Benjamin Watkins Leigh House, also known as the Wickham-Leigh House, is a historic home located in Richmond, Virginia.  It was built between 1812 and 1816, and is a three-story, four bay by three bay, Federal style rectangular stuccoed brick dwelling.  It features an Italianate bracketed cornice and a small Italianate front porch. It was the home of Senator Benjamin W. Leigh (1781-1849) and sold to Lieutenant Governor John Munford Gregory (1804-1884) upon Leigh's death in 1849.  The house was sold to the Sheltering Arms Hospital in 1932, after which a large three-story wing was added to the east side connecting it to the William H. Grant House. The house was later sold to the Medical College of Virginia and used for offices.

It was listed on the National Register of Historic Places in 1969.

References

Houses on the National Register of Historic Places in Virginia
Italianate architecture in Virginia
Federal architecture in Virginia
Houses completed in 1816
Houses in Richmond, Virginia
National Register of Historic Places in Richmond, Virginia
Virginia Commonwealth University
1816 establishments in Virginia